Samuel Peter Tarry (born 27 August 1982) is a British politician who has been the Member of Parliament (MP) for Ilford South since 2019. He is a member of the Socialist Campaign Group parliamentary caucus. On 10 October 2022 he was deselected by the Ilford South Constituency Labour Party as its candidate for the next election. He remains a member of the Labour Party.

Early life
Tarry was born in August 1982 in Westminster. The eldest son of The Revd Canon Gordon Tarry, a Church of England clergyman, he grew up on St. Andrews Road and attended Highlands Primary School in Ilford. His family later moved to Seven Kings, and Tarry completed his secondary education at St Edward's Church of England School in Romford. He acquired his first job at the age of 15 as a cleaner at Redbridge College, and later worked at Sainsbury's to help pay for his studies at University College London.

Political career 
From 2009 to 2011, Tarry was the Chair of Young Labour, the youth wing of the Labour Party.  Tarry went on to be active in anti-fascism, including working as a Community Organiser for Hope not Hate.

Tarry was a Labour Party councillor for Chadwell Heath ward, in the London Borough of Barking and Dagenham, from 2010 to 2018. Tarry was criticised for allegedly living in his home in Brighton, which is 70 miles away from his council seat in Barking and Dagenham. Tarry was investigated by police for electoral fraud in relation to this matter. Tarry was cleared by the police investigation, as he was found to own a second home in Barking and Dagenham, and therefore was legally resident in Barking and Dagenham at the time of his election.

In 2016 Tarry worked under Jon Lansman's supervision as a director of Jeremy Corbyn's successful Labour Party leadership campaign.

Tarry subsequently worked as the national political officer for the TSSA trade union, and served as the president of a thinktank, the Centre for Labour and Social Studies (CLASS).

In 2017 Tarry stood for selection to be the Labour parliamentary candidate for the Labour-held seat of Hull West and Hessle. He was the favourite to be selected, because of his relationship with Corbyn. The party instead selected Emma Hardy, a local teacher and trade union organiser.

In 2019 Tarry stood for selection to be the Labour parliamentary candidate for the seat of Ilford South, previously held by the Labour MP Mike Gapes. His campaign was jointly run by GMB and Momentum. On 4 October 2019, the evening before members were due to vote, a rival candidate, Redbridge Council leader Jas Athwal, was suspended from the party over an allegation of sexual harassment. On 22 October 2019, after a postponement of the vote, and with Athwal ineligible due to his suspension, Tarry was selected. Athwal was subsequently cleared of any wrongdoing.

Parliamentary career
Tarry was elected to represent Ilford South at the 2019 general election with a majority of 24,101 votes. It has been a safe seat for the Labour Party since 1997.

Tarry was appointed to the Transport Select Committee, on which he has been credited as being a "passionate advocate for public ownership". In this role, he called for introduction of a death in service payment scheme for London transport workers. He also joined the Socialist Campaign Group of left-wing Labour MPs.

Tarry said in 2019 that "There are people associated with the Labour Party who have sought to exploit the issue [of antisemitism] just because they don't agree with Jeremy Corbyn over an issue of foreign policy." The Jewish Labour Movement criticised this remark as underplaying the issue of antisemitism in the Labour Party under Jeremy Corbyn. In response Tarry said that he was "clearly referring" to Mike Gapes who held the seat prior to himself. He further stated, "As someone who has worked with many interfaith groups and organisations, including Searchlight and Hope not Hate, specifically to fight antisemitism and racism, this is something I care deeply about and would never seek to downplay."

During the 2020 Labour leadership election campaign Tarry said that Keir Starmer would have to show how he would appeal to northern seats that had abandoned Labour, given that he was a "North London lawyer" and had opposed Brexit. Tarry subsequently supported Rebecca Long-Bailey in the leadership contest.

From April 2020 until January 2021 was a Parliamentary Private Secretary to Ed Miliband in the Shadow Business, Energy and Industrial Strategy team, and as part of the parliamentary team of Angela Rayner, Deputy Leader of the Labour Party, when he was appointed to the role of Shadow Minister for Buses and Local Transport.

The summer of 2022 saw significant amounts of industrial unrest. Starmer instructed members of his shadow cabinet to refrain from joining picket lines. However, some Labour MPs did appear on picket lines including frontbenchers Kate Osborne, Paula Barker, Peter Kyle and Navendu Mishra. Tarry was dismissed from his position as Shadow Minister for Buses and Local Transport on 27 July after appearing on a rail strike picket at Euston railway station. He said in a TV interview that workers should receive a pay rise in line with inflation though Labour policy was that pay increases should be based on negotiation. A spokesperson for the party said that "Sam Tarry was sacked because he booked himself onto media programmes without permission and then made up policy on the hoof." However, his sacking was criticised by trade union leaders and Tarry wrote in a newspaper opinion piece that "failing to join the striking rail workers on a picket line would have been an abject dereliction of duty for me as a Labour MP."

In July 2022 a trigger ballot, a process carried out in every Labour-held seat ahead of a general election, was held in Ilford South to determine whether Tarry should face reselection; Tarry lost the vote 57.5% to 42.5%. On 10 October 2022 a reselection vote was held, which Tarry lost to local council leader Jas Athwal by 361 votes to 499.

Personal life
Tarry married paediatrician Julia Fozard in 2016, and they have two sons. It was reported in July 2022 that the couple had separated. He is in a relationship with Deputy Leader of the Labour Party Angela Rayner.

References

External links

1982 births
Living people
Councillors in the London Borough of Barking and Dagenham
English socialists
English trade unionists
Labour Party (UK) MPs for English constituencies
Labour Party (UK) councillors
People from Dagenham
People from Ilford
People from Westminster
UK MPs 2019–present
21st-century British politicians